Tudose is a surname. Notable people with the surname include:

Alexandru Tudose (born 1987), Romanian footballer
Gabriel Tudose (born 1996), Romanian footballer
Mihai Tudose (born 1967), Romanian politician

Romanian-language surnames